Durga is a Hindu goddess.

Durga may also refer to:

Film and television
 Durga (1974 film), an Indian Malayalam-language film
 Durgaa, 1985 Indian Hindi-language film, starring Rajesh Khanna
 Durga (1990 film), an Indian Tamil-language film
 Durga (2000 film) or Pottu Amman, Indian Telugu and Tamil film
 Durga (2002 film), an Indian Hindi-language film by J. D. Chakravarthy, starring Priyanka Upendra and Sayaji Shinde
 Durga (unreleased film), an unreleased Indian action film
 Durga – Mata Ki Chhaya, Indian television drama series
 Durga Sohay, a 2017 Indian Bengali-language family drama film
 Kahaani 2: Durga Rani Singh, a 2016 Indian Hindi-language mystery thriller film

Music
 Durga (raga), a raga in Hindustani Classical music
 Durga Rising, a 1997 studio album by the artists Barb Jungr, Kuljit Bhamra and Russell Churney

People
 Durga (surname), an Indian surname
 Durga Bahadur Rawat, Nepali politician
 Durga Bai Vyom (born 1973), Indian artist
 Durga Bhagwat (1910–2002), Indian scholar
 Durga Boro (born 1987), Indian professional footballer
 Durga Charan Banerjee (1898–1952), Indian jurist
 Durga Charan Mohanty (1912–1985), Odia Indian spiritual writer
 Durga Charan Nag (1846–1899), 19-century Hindu saint
 Durga Charan Panigrahi (born 1961), Indian mining scientist
 Durga Chew-Bose (born 1986), writer based in Brooklyn
 Durga Das Basu, Indian jurist and lawyer
 Durga Das Uikey (born 1963), Indian politician
 Durga Dass, Indian politician
 Durga Deulkar, Indian educationist and writer
 Durga Ghimire (born 1948), Nepali social worker
 Durga Jain, Indian social worker
 Durga Jasraj (born 1964), Indian original content producer
 Durga Keshar Khanal (born 1944), 1st Provincial Governor of Karnali Pradesh
 Durga Khote (1905–1991), Indian actress
 Durga Krishna (born 1996), Indian actress and dancer
 Durga Kumari B.K., Nepali politician
 Durga Lal (1948–1990), Indian Kathak dancer
 Durga Lal Shrestha (born 1937), Nepali poet
 Durga Malla (1913–1944), Indian freedom fighter
 Durga McBroom (born 1962), American singer and actress
 Durga Mohan Bhattacharyya (1899–1965), Indian scholar of Sanskrit
 Durga Mohan Das (1841–1897), Brahmo Samaj leader
 Durga Mukherjee (1933–2011), Indian cricketer
 Durga Paudel, Nepali politician
 Durga Prasad Bhattarai (born 1961), Nepali career diplomat
 Durga Prasad Dhar (1918–1975), Kashmiri politician
 Durga Prasad Yadav (born 1954), Indian politician
 Durga Rangila, Punjabi singer
 Durga Shakti Nagpal (born 1985), Indian bureaucrat
 Durga Shanker Mishra (born 1961), Indian politician
 Durga Sob (born 1966), Nepali feminist activist
 Durga Soren (1970–2009), Indian politician
 Durgavati Devi (Durga Bhabhi), an Indian Revolutionary and Member of HSRA
 Kanwar Durga Chand (1922–2000), leader of the Bharatiya Janata Party from Himachal Pradesh

Characters
 Durga the Hutt, a character in the Star Wars novels

Places and institutions
 Durga, the Sanskrit word meaning "inaccessible place"
 Durga Bhabani, a village development committee in Nepal
 Durga College, a degree college located in Raipur, Chhattisgarh, India
 Durga Mandir (disambiguation), the name of several temples in India
 Durga Tekdi, a hill in Nigdi Pune
 Durga Sagar, the largest lake in southern Bangladesh
 Durga Vahini, the women's wing of the Vishva Hindu Parishad
 Durga Nagar Part-V
 Kammata Durga
 Durga Devi temple, Guhagar
 Channarayana Durga, a hill fort near Koratagere

Other uses 
 Durga Puja, an annual Hindu festival

See also
 Kahaani, a 2012 Indian film with strong allusions to the Hindu Goddess Durga
 Maharakshak: Devi, a 2015 Indian television series about the Hindu Goddess Durga (Devi)
 Demus (surname)